Michael Charles Prestwich OBE (born  30 January 1943) is an English historian, specialising on the history of medieval England, in particular the reign of Edward I. He is retired, having been Professor of History at Durham University and Head of the Department of History until 2007.

Early life
Prestwich is the son of two Oxford historians, John Prestwich and Menna Prestwich. His father, "the redoubtable mediaevalist ... who knew so much and published so little", had worked at Bletchley Park during the war, working among other things on the breaking of U-boat codes. Michael was educated at the Dragon School in Oxford, and then went to a well-known public school Charterhouse, before winning a scholarship to Magdalen College, Oxford.  After being awarded an MA and First in History, he completed his D.Phil. with a thesis entitled Edward I's wars and their financing 1294-1307 at Christ Church, Oxford.

Academic career
After a year as a lecturer at Christ Church, Michael moved in 1969 to St Andrews where he stayed for ten years before moving to Durham as a Reader. He soon became Professor, and has been head of the department for two spells.  For seven years in the 1990s he was Pro Vice-Chancellor, with a wide brief which even extended to health and safety.  He was chairman of the trustees of the Durham Union Society until 2013.  He twice chaired the History panel for the Research Assessment Exercise, in 1996 and 2001.

Prestwich has provided support and encouragement to other historians, in particular Ann Hyland, who recognised his assistance in her work on medieval warhorses. Prestwich wrote the foreword for both of her books on the subject.  On his retirement, he was presented with a festschrift, War, Government and Aristocracy in the British Isles c.1150-1500, edited by Chris Given-Wilson, Ann Kettle and Len Scales.

Prestwich was appointed OBE in the 2010 New Year Honours.

Personal life
He is married to fellow Oxford-educated historian Maggie Prestwich, who recently retired as Senior Tutor at Trevelyan College, Durham. He lives in Western Hill in Durham, and has a dog and three grown-up children. He retired in 2008.

Select publications

War, Politics and Finance under Edward I (1972), 
The Three Edwards: War and State in England, 1272-1377 (1980), 
Edward I (1988), 
English Politics in the Thirteenth Century  (1990), 
Armies and Warfare in the Middle Ages: the English Experience (1996), 
Plantagenet England, 1225-1360 (2005), 
Knight (2010),

Contributions
Editor of a collection of his father's essays:
J.O. Prestwich, The Place of War in English History, 1066-1214 (2004) Woodbridge: Boydell Press 
Edward Mirzoeff (2015)  The sea of peril. The Oldie 322, June 2015, p. 30.

Notes

External links
Home page
Interview with Michael Prestwich about the evolution of the discipline of history

1943 births
English historians
British medievalists
Living people
Fellows of the Royal Historical Society
Academics of the University of St Andrews
Academics of Durham University
British military historians
Officers of the Order of the British Empire
People educated at Charterhouse School
Alumni of Magdalen College, Oxford
Alumni of Christ Church, Oxford